Head or Heart is the second studio album by American singer-songwriter Christina Perri, released on April 1, 2014, via Atlantic Records. It was originally expected to be released on March 11, 2014, but was pushed back to April 1, 2014.

Background 
In an interview with Pollstar's Sarah Marie Pittman published on April 25, 2014, Perri described the pressure surrounding the writing of her second album as unavoidable, stating: "I had to completely trick myself, to be quite honest, and pretend that absolutely nobody was going to listen."
 
The first song that she wrote for the album was "Trust", according to Perri, which inspired the rest of the album. She wrote it by herself for three months and then along with other songwriters for another three months, and recorded a total of 49 songs that she had to choose from for the album by May 2013. Perri says that these 13 songs that she has chosen for the album "were what I think are pure songs, where I wasn't trying."

Perri began tweeting and posting pictures on Instagram about the progress of her second studio album using the hashtag "#albumtwo", and on June 21, 2013, announced that the second album was coming together. On November 11, 2013, Perri announced that her first single from her new album, called "Human", would be released on iTunes on November 18, 2013. On November 28, 2013, Perri revealed that her second album would be titled Head or Heart and is due to be released in March 2014. Perri confessed during an interview with Radio.com that she felt burnt out after promoting her last album, Lovestrong (2011). She revealed, "I didn't want to do anything that wasn't genuine, and I was afraid of phoning it in or forcing anything. [...] I remember laying on the floor of my house just crying. Good crying and sad crying at the same time. I was just trying to believe the things that had happened."

Recording and production 
The album was recorded in 2013 with producers Martin Johnson, Jake Gosling, John Hill and Butch Walker. She recorded nine of the album's songs with Gosling near London over an eight-week period before returning to Los Angeles to record the remaining four tracks.

In a December 2013 interview with Radio.com, Perri revealed she had worked with Ed Sheeran on a track called "Be My Forever". She stated: 
I was the most in love I may have ever been in my whole life, which is awesome because I knew I had a happy song in me. ... As much as I love the heart-wrenching stuff, I didn't want to force a happy song, and I think you can always tell when a song is fake. I remember going in the studio with this guy and him looking at me and I was glowing. And I'm like, "I'm so sorry. I'm in love. This is going to be awful. We're never going to write a song."

Promotion 

In support of the album, Perri embarked on a two-month tour across North America. The Head or Heart Tour took place in the spring of 2014, from April 4 through May 26: it began in Denver, Colorado, and ended in Vancouver, British Columbia, Canada.

Singles 
"Human" was released as the first single from the album on November 18, 2013. As of June 2014, the single has sold over a million digital copies in the US. "Burning Gold" was released as the second single in the United Kingdom on June 9, 2014. The accompanying music video premiered on August 1, 2014.

Her third single off the album, "The Words" was released on January 26, 2015 along with the music video, starring Colin O'Donoghue and directed by Iouri Philippe Paillé.

Reception

Commercial performance
Head or Heart debuted at number four on the US Billboard 200, selling 40,000 copies in its first week.

Critical reception

Upon its release, Head or Heart was met with generally mixed reviews from music critics. James Christopher Monger of AllMusic awarded the album 3 and a half out of 5 stars, and described the album as "more confident than her debut, yet retaining much of its vulnerability". In a 2 out of 5 stars review for The Guardian, Phil Mongredien stated that the album is "heavy on big, earnest ballads that – with the exception of the soaring 'Sea of Lovers' – are more technically proficient than engaging."

Track listing 
Credits adapted from booklet.

Charts

Certifications

Release history

Credits 
Credits are adapted from AllMusic.

Major credits
Jack Antonoff — composer, musician, producer, programmer
Jim Eliot — composer
 Jake Gosling  — choir/chorus, engineer, musician, producer, programmer
Kevin Griffin — composer
David Ryan Harris — composer
John Hill — musician, producer, programmer
David Hodges — composer, musician
Martin Johnson — composer, engineer, mixing, musician, producer, programmer
Christina Perri — choir/chorus, composer, cover direction, musician, primary artist

Production credits
Jonathan Allen — engineer
Mark Bengston — mixing assistant, Pro-Tools
Chris Bernard — drum technician
Delbert Bowers — assistant engineer, mixing assistant
Michael Brauer — mixing
Tom Coyne — mastering
Gordon Davidson — assistant
Chris Gallad — assistant engineer, mixing assistant
Gersh — drum technician
John Horne — assistant engineer
Christian Humphreys — assistant engineer
Marcus Johnson — assistant engineer

Music credits
Ruth Barrett — string arrangements
Charlie Bisharat — strings
Thomas Bowes — leader
David Campbell — conductor, string arrangements
Lori Casteel — music preparation
Mike Casteel — music preparation
Adam Coltman — choir/chorus
Tommy Culm — choir/chorus
Murray Cummings — musician
Sophie Davis — choir/chorus
Hannah Dawson — musician
Matt Funes — strings
Matthew Gooderham — choir/chorus
Eli Gosling — children's chorus
Lucy Gosling — choir/chorus
Peter Gosling — choir/chorus, musician
Zuban Gosling — children's chorus
Isobel Griffiths — string contractor
Julian Hallmark — strings
John Hanson — musician
Marianne Haynes — musician
Nicholas Holland — musician
Jeremy Isaac — musician
Suzie Katayama — string contractor, strings

Misc credits
Ryan Chisholm — management
Tony Corey — marketing
Pete Ganbarg — A&R
Tom Gates — management

References 

Atlantic Records albums
Christina Perri albums
2014 albums